Jordan Red are a British alternative metal band originating from London, England. The band was formed in 2020 by vocalist Daniel Leigh and guitarist Dan Baker, with As Lions members Conor O'Keefe and Dave Fee as touring and session members. In 2022, they self-released their debut album, "Hands That Built The World", which entered the Official Charts, peaking at #14 in Independent Albums Breakers and #16 in the Top 40 Rock and Metal Albums Charts. Subsequently, their single 'Awake' received national airplay on BBC Radio 1 and Planet Rock.

Members
Daniel Leigh – lead vocals
Dan Baker – guitar

Touring and session members
Conor O'Keefe – bass
Dave Fee – drums

Discography

Albums

Singles
 Beautiful Monsters (2020)
 Don't Let The Heavens Fall (2020)
 Hands That Built The World (2020)
 Way Down (2020)
 Freak Show (2021)
 Spilling My Blood (2022)
 Awake (2022)

References

English hard rock musical groups